Georges Charpak (born Jerzy Charpak, 1 August 1924 – 29 September 2010) was a Polish-born French physicist, who was awarded the Nobel Prize in Physics in 1992.

Life
Georges Charpak was born Jerzy Charpak to Jewish parents, Anna (Szapiro) and Maurice Charpak, in the village of Dąbrowica in Poland (now Dubrovytsia in Ukraine). Charpak's family moved from Poland to Paris when he was seven years old, beginning his study of mathematics in 1941 at the Lycée Saint Louis. The actor and film director André Charpak was his younger brother.

During World War II Charpak served in the resistance and was imprisoned by Vichy authorities in 1943. In 1944 he was deported to the Nazi concentration camp at Dachau, where he remained until the camp was liberated in 1945.

After classes préparatoires studies at Lycée Saint-Louis in Paris and later at Lycée Joffre in Montpellier, he joined in 1945 the Paris-based École des Mines, one of the most prestigious engineering schools in France. The following year he became a naturalized French citizen. He graduated in 1948, earning the French degree of Civil Engineer of Mines (Ingénieur Civil des Mines equivalent to a Master's degree) becoming a pupil in the laboratory of Frédéric Joliot-Curie at the Collège de France during 1949, the year after Curie had directed construction of the first atomic pile within France. While at the Collège, Charpak secured a research position for the National Centre for Scientific Research (CNRS). He received his PhD in 1954 in nuclear physics at the Collège de France, receiving the qualification after having written a thesis on the subject of very-low-energy radiation due to disintegration of nuclei (Charpak & Suzor).

In 1959,  he joined the staff of CERN (European Organization for Nuclear Research) in Geneva, where he invented and developed the multiwire proportional chamber. The chamber was patented and that quickly superseded the old bubble chambers, allowing for better data processing. This new creation had been made public during 1968.   Charpak was later to become a joint inventor with Nlolc and Policarpo of the scintillation drift chamber during the latter parts of the 1970s. He eventually retired from CERN in 1991. In 1980, Georges Charpak became professor-in-residence at École supérieure de physique et de chimie industrielles in Paris (ESPCI) and held the Joliot-Curie Chair there in 1984.  This is where he developed and demonstrated the powerful applications of the particle detectors he invented, most notably for enabling better health diagnostics. 
He was the co-founder of a number of start-up in the biolab arena, including Molecular Engines Laboratories, Biospace Instruments and SuperSonic Imagine – together with Mathias Fink. He was elected to the French Academy of Sciences on 20 May 1985.

Georges Charpak was awarded the Nobel Prize in Physics in 1992 "for his invention and development of particle detectors, in particular the multiwire proportional chamber", with affiliations to both École supérieure de physique et de chimie industrielles (ESPCI) and CERN. This was the last time a single person was awarded the physics prize, as of 2020. In 1999, Charpak received the Golden Plate Award of the American Academy of Achievement.

In France, Charpak was a very strong advocate for nuclear power.  Charpak was a member of the Board of Sponsors of the Bulletin of the Atomic Scientists.

Charpak married Dominique Vidal in 1953. They had three children. The pediatrician Nathalie Charpak (born 1955) is his daughter.

Charpak died on 29 September 2010, in Paris, at the age of 86.

Publications

Books
 La vie à fil tendu, co-authored with Dominique Saudinos (1993 Odile Jacob)
 Devenez sorciers, devenez savants, co-authored with Henri Broch (Odile Jacob). Published in English as "Debunked!" by the Johns Hopkins University Press.

Technical reports
 Charpak, G. & M. Gourdin. "The K{sup 0}anti K{sup 0} System", European Organization for Nuclear Research, Paris University, (July 11, 1967).
 Charpak, G. "Evolution of Some Particle Detectors Based On the Discharge in Gases", European Organization for Nuclear Research, (November 19, 1969).
 Charpak, G. & F. Sauli, "High Accuracy, Two-Dimensional Read-Out in Multiwire Proportional Chambers", European Organization for Nuclear Research, (February 14, 1973).
 Charpak, G.; Jeavons, A.; Sauli, F. & R. Stubbs, "High-Accuracy Measurements of the Centre of Gravity of Avalanches in Proportional Chambers", European Organization for Nuclear Research, (September 24, 1973).

References

External links

  including the Nobel Lecture, December 8, 1992 Electronic Imaging of Ionizing Radiation with Limited Avalanches in Gases
 Georges Charpak on nobel-winners.com
 Georges Charpak U.S. Patents
 
Georges Charpak, Nobel Luminaries Project, The Museum of the Jewish People at Beit Hatfutsot

1924 births
2010 deaths
Nobel laureates in Physics
French Nobel laureates
Polish Nobel laureates
20th-century French physicists
People associated with CERN
Jews from Galicia (Eastern Europe)
20th-century French Jews
Polish emigrants to France
French people of Polish-Jewish descent
Jewish physicists
Dachau concentration camp survivors
French Resistance members
Members of the French Academy of Sciences
Foreign associates of the National Academy of Sciences
Foreign Members of the Russian Academy of Sciences
Academic staff of ESPCI Paris
Lycée Saint-Louis alumni
Mines Paris - PSL alumni
French National Centre for Scientific Research scientists
Accelerator physicists
People from Rivne Oblast